Anli Lu station is a station on Line 15 of the Beijing Subway.

Station layout 
The station has an underground island platform.

Exits 
There are 5 exits, lettered A1, A2, B, C, and D. Exits A2 and D are accessible.

References

Beijing Subway stations in Chaoyang District